This is a list of communists imprisoned by the Kingdom of Romania for their political activity during the era of repression of communists, when the Communist Party and communist ideology were banned. Many of these communists belonged to the "prison wing" of the Romanian Communist Party, as opposed to the "Muscovite wing", which resided in exile in Moscow.

Notes

References

Communism in Romania
Political repression in Romania
Kingdom of Romania
Communists imprisoned by the Kingdom of Romania
Anti-communism in Romania
Communists imprisoned by the Kingdom of Romania